= These =

These may refer to:

- the plural proximal demonstrative in English
- These, a variation of the Greek Theseus in Etruscan mythology
- Thèse, French word for the academic dissertation or thesis
